Cranbury is a township in Middlesex County, in the U.S. state of New Jersey. Located within the Raritan Valley region, Cranbury is roughly equidistant between New York City and Philadelphia in the heart of the state. As of the 2020 United States census, the township's population was 3,842, a decrease of 15 (−.4%) from the 2010 census count of 3,857, which in turn reflected an increase of 630 (+19.5%) from the 3,227 counted in the 2000 census.

Cranbury, along with the municipalities of Bellmawr, Egg Harbor Township, Montclair, and Woodbridge Township, were among the original five municipalities (of 565 in the state) in New Jersey that had authorized dispensaries for the sale of medical cannabis in their municipality. However, on July 12, 2021, the township unanimously passed an ordinance banning all types of cannabis businesses from operating within the municipality.

History 
A deed for a sale of land and improvements dated March 1, 1698, is the earliest evidence of buildings constructed in present-day Cranbury. A home in Cranbury was used by Alexander Hamilton and the Marquis de Lafayette as a headquarters during the American Revolutionary War, and they were visited by General George Washington on June 26, 1778. As part of orders issued during the Presidency of George Washington, maps of Cranbury were made showing the presence of a church, a mill and 25 other buildings. During its earliest years, the location was usually spelled as "Cranberry". Rev. Joseph G. Symmes argued in 1857 that the name was spelled improperly and that the suffix "bury" was more appropriate, leading the name of the community and brook to be changed to "Cranbury" in 1869. The name has been attributed to wild cranberries that grew in the area.

The so-called Hightstown rail accident occurred in or near Cranbury, in 1833. Among the passengers aboard were Tyrone Power and Cornelius Vanderbilt.

Cranbury was incorporated as a township by an act of the New Jersey Legislature on March 7, 1872, from portions of both Monroe Township and South Brunswick Township. Portions of the township were taken on April 1, 1919, to form Plainsboro Township.

George Washington's headquarters were located in Cranbury while planning for the Battle of Monmouth, a major turning point during the Revolutionary War.

The township celebrated its tricentennial in 1998.

Updike Parsonage Barn, originally constructed  1759, was disassembled, relocated and reconstructed in 2010 at its current location in Barn Park.

Historic district

The Cranbury Historic District is a  historic district encompassing the village of Cranbury along Main and Prospect streets; Maplewood and Scott avenues; Bunker Hill Road; Symmes Court; Westminster, Park and Wesley places. It was added to the National Register of Historic Places on September 18, 1980 for its significance in architecture and commerce. The district includes 177 contributing buildings, including the Old Cranbury School, which was added individually to the NRHP in 1971.

Many buildings on Cranbury's Main Street and in the surrounding area date to the 18th or 19th century.  The nomination form describes how "Cranbury is the best preserved 19th century village in Middlesex County" and states that "While there are many small mill towns in New Jersey, few are in such an undisturbed environment as that of Cranbury." The John S. Silvers Mansion, built 1886, features Queen Anne style architecture. The Elizabeth M. Wagner History Center of the Cranbury Historical and Preservation Society is located in a former gristmiller's house and has a display on Cranberry Mills.

Geography 

According to the United States Census Bureau, the township had a total area of 13.43 square miles (34.79 km2), including 13.28 square miles (34.40 km2) of land and 0.15 square miles (0.39 km2) of water (1.12%).

Cranbury CDP (2010 Census population of 2,181) is an unincorporated community and census-designated place (CDP) located within Cranbury Township. Despite the match between the name of the Township and the CDP, the two are not one and the same, as was the case for most paired Township / CDP combinations (i.e., a CDP with the same as its parent township) before the 2010 Census, when most such paired CDPs were coextensive with a township of the same name.

Other unincorporated communities, localities and place names located partially or completely within the township include Brain Grove Lake, Cranbury Station, Wescott and Wyckoffs Mills.

The township borders Monroe Township, Plainsboro Township and South Brunswick Township in Middlesex County; and East Windsor Township in Mercer County.

Demographics

2010 census

The Census Bureau's 2006–2010 American Community Survey showed that (in 2010 inflation-adjusted dollars) median household income was $131,667 (with a margin of error of +/− $21,076) and the median family income was $146,250 (+/− $24,045). Males had a median income of $122,566 (+/− $25,917) versus $60,781 (+/− $22,066) for females. The per capita income for the borough was $55,236 (+/− $5,718). About 3.1% of families and 4.1% of the population were below the poverty line, including 8.2% of those under age 18 and none of those age 65 or over.

2000 census
As of the 2000 United States census there were 3,227 people, 1,091 households, and 877 families residing in the township.  The population density was 240.6 people per square mile (92.9/km2).  There were 1,121 housing units at an average density of 83.6 per square mile (32.3/km2).  The racial makeup of the township was 88.78% White, 2.26% African American, 7.41% Asian, 0.22% from other races, and 1.33% from two or more races. Hispanic or Latino of any race were 1.70% of the population.

There were 1,091 households, out of which 46.3% had children under the age of 18 living with them, 74.6% were married couples living together, 4.3% had a female householder with no husband present, and 19.6% were non-families. 16.3% of all households were made up of individuals, and 7.9% had someone living alone who was 65 years of age or older.  The average household size was 2.92 and the average family size was 3.31.

In the township the population was spread out, with 30.4% under the age of 18, 3.4% from 18 to 24, 27.6% from 25 to 44, 27.3% from 45 to 64, and 11.2% who were 65 years of age or older.  The median age was 40 years. For every 100 females, there were 93.3 males.  For every 100 females age 18 and over, there were 90.4 males.

The median income for a household in the township was $111,680, and the median income for a family was $128,410. Males had a median income of $94,683 versus $44,167 for females. The per capita income for the township was $50,698.  About 0.7% of families and 1.6% of the population were below the poverty line, including 2.7% of those under age 18 and 0.9% of those age 65 or over.

Economy 
Cranbury is host to many warehouses along Route 130 and the roads leading to the NJ Turnpike.  A company making the Boy Scout Pinewood Derby cars is also here. Cranbury was noted for a used Rolls-Royce dealership located in the center of township, but it has gone out of business. The alternative energy business Blacklight Power, which occupies a building formerly occupied by Creative Playthings, is in fact located in East Windsor, in an area served by the Cranbury Post Office.

The Associated University Presses is an academic publishing company supplying textbooks to colleges and universities.

Government

Local government 

Cranbury Township is governed under the Township form of government, one of 141 municipalities (of the 564) statewide governed under this form. The Township Committee is comprised of five members, who are elected directly by the voters at-large in partisan elections to serve three-year terms of office on a staggered basis, with either one or two seats coming up for election each year as part of the November general election in a three-year cycle. At an annual reorganization meeting, the Township Committee selects one of its members to serve as Mayor. In 1990, the Cranbury Township Committee was expanded from three to five members and the position of Township Administrator by ordinance.

, members of the Cranbury Township Committee are Mayor Barbara F. Rogers (D, term on committee and as mayor ends December 31, 2022), Deputy Mayor Michael J. Ferrante (D, term on committee ends 2024, term as deputy mayor ends 2022), Eman El-Badawi (D, 2024), Matthew A. Scott (D, 2023) and M. Evelyn Spann (R, 2022).

In 2018, the township had an average property tax bill of $11,960, the highest in the county, compared to an average bill of $8,767 statewide.

Federal, state and county representation 
Cranbury Township is located in the 12th Congressional District and is part of New Jersey's 14th state legislative district.

 

Middlesex County is governed by a Board of County Commissioners, whose seven members are elected at-large on a partisan basis to serve three-year terms of office on a staggered basis, with either two or three seats coming up for election each year as part of the November general election. At an annual reorganization meeting held in January, the board selects from among its members a commissioner director and deputy director. , Middlesex County's Commissioners (with party affiliation, term-end year, and residence listed in parentheses) are 
Commissioner Director Ronald G. Rios (D, Carteret, term as commissioner ends December 31, 2024; term as commissioner director ends 2022),
Commissioner Deputy Director Shanti Narra (D, North Brunswick, term as commissioner ends 2024; term as deputy director ends 2022),
Claribel A. "Clary" Azcona-Barber (D, New Brunswick, 2022),
Charles Kenny (D, Woodbridge Township, 2022),
Leslie Koppel (D, Monroe Township, 2023),
Chanelle Scott McCullum (D, Piscataway, 2024) and 
Charles E. Tomaro (D, Edison, 2023).
Constitutional officers are
County Clerk Nancy Pinkin (D, 2025, East Brunswick),
Sheriff Mildred S. Scott (D, 2022, Piscataway) and 
Surrogate Claribel Cortes (D, 2026; North Brunswick).

Politics
As of March 2011, there were a total of 2,768 registered voters in Cranbury Township, of which 836 (30.2%) were registered as Democrats, 684 (24.7%) were registered as Republicans and 1,246 (45.0%) were registered as Unaffiliated. There were 2 voters registered as either Libertarians or Greens.

In the 2012 presidential election, Democrat Barack Obama received 52.0% of the vote (1,076 cast), ahead of Republican Mitt Romney with 46.9% (971 votes), and other candidates with 1.1% (22 votes), among the 2,082 ballots cast by the township's 2,839 registered voters (13 ballots were spoiled), for a turnout of 73.3%. In the 2008 presidential election, Democrat Barack Obama received 53.0% of the vote (1,153 cast), ahead of Republican John McCain with 45.3% (986 votes) and other candidates with 1.3% (29 votes), among the 2,176 ballots cast by the township's 2,777 registered voters, for a turnout of 78.4%. In the 2004 presidential election, Republican George W. Bush received 50.8% of the vote (1,044 ballots cast), outpolling Democrat John Kerry with 48.0% (987 votes) and other candidates with 0.9% (23 votes), among the 2,055 ballots cast by the township's 2,510 registered voters, for a turnout percentage of 81.9.

In the 2013 gubernatorial election, Republican Chris Christie received 67.1% of the vote (941 cast), ahead of Democrat Barbara Buono with 31.3% (439 votes), and other candidates with 1.6% (22 votes), among the 1,421 ballots cast by the township's 2,850 registered voters (19 ballots were spoiled), for a turnout of 49.9%. In the 2009 gubernatorial election, Republican Chris Christie received 54.6% of the vote (901 ballots cast), ahead of  Democrat Jon Corzine with 35.5% (585 votes), Independent Chris Daggett with 8.7% (144 votes) and other candidates with 0.7% (11 votes), among the 1,649 ballots cast by the township's 2,711 registered voters, yielding a 60.8% turnout.

Education 

The Cranbury School District serves children in public school for pre-kindergarten through eighth grade at Cranbury School. As of the 2020–21 school year, the district, comprised of one school, had an enrollment of 463 students and 55.9 classroom teachers (on an FTE basis), for a student–teacher ratio of 8.3:1. For the 1996–97 school years, Cranbury School was formally designated as a National Blue Ribbon School, the highest honor that an American public school can achieve. During the 2009–10 school year, Cranbury School was awarded the Blue Ribbon School Award of Excellence a second time, and a third time for the 2016–17 school year.

For ninth through twelfth grades, students move on to Princeton High School in Princeton, as part of a sending/receiving relationship with the Princeton Public Schools. Cranbury Township is granted a seat on the Princeton Regional Schools Board of Education, with the designated representative only voting on issues pertaining to Princeton High School and district-wide issues. As of the 2020–2021 school year, the high school had an enrollment of 1,555 students and 125.8 classroom teachers (on an FTE basis), for a student–teacher ratio of 12.4:1. Cranbury students had attended Hightstown High School and then Lawrence High School before the relationship was established with Princeton.

Eighth grade students from all of Middlesex County are eligible to apply to attend the high school programs offered by the Middlesex County Vocational and Technical Schools, a county-wide vocational school district that offers full-time career and technical education at Middlesex County Academy in Edison, the Academy for Allied Health and Biomedical Sciences in Woodbridge Township and at its East Brunswick, Perth Amboy and Piscataway technical high schools, with no tuition charged to students for attendance.

Public libraries 
The Cranbury Public Library serves Cranbury residents, sharing a facility with the Cranbury School until summer 2020 when the school evicted the library to provide additional learning space during the COVID-19 pandemic. The public library has operated out of a pocket library since early 2021 while a free-standing public library is being built at 30 Park Place West.

Places of worship
The First Presbyterian Church was founded  and the current church was built in 1839. The United Methodist Church was built in 1848. Both are contributing properties of the historic district.

Transportation

Roads and highways

Several major roads and highways pass through the township Cranbury hosts a  section of Interstate 95 (the New Jersey Turnpike). While there are no exits in Cranbury, the township is accessible by the Turnpike in neighboring East Windsor Township (Exit 8) and Monroe Township (Exit 8A). The Molly Pitcher Service Area is located at mile marker 71.7 on the southbound side.

Other significant roads passing through Cranbury include U.S. Route 130, County Route 535, County Route 539, County Route 615 and County Route 614.

Public transportation
Middlesex County offers the M6 MCAT shuttle route providing service to Jamesburg and Plainsboro Township.

Notable people 

People who were born in, residents of, or otherwise closely associated with Cranbury include:

 Melanie Balcomb (born 1962), head coach of the Vanderbilt Commodores women's basketball team
 Todd Beamer (1968–2001), passenger aboard United Airlines Flight 93, who said "Let's roll" to fellow passengers with whom he was planning an attack on terrorists who had taken over the cockpit
 Scott Brunner (born 1957), quarterback who played in the NFL from 1981 to 1986, most notably for the New York Giants
 Ronald C. Davidson (1941–2016), physicist, professor and scientific administrator who served as the first director of the MIT Plasma Science and Fusion Center and as director of the Princeton Plasma Physics Laboratory
 Wendy Gooditis (born Gwendolyn Wallace in 1960), politician who represents Virginia's 10th House of Delegates district in the Virginia House of Delegates
 Noah Harlan, independent filmmaker
 Ralph Izzo, businessman and former nuclear physicist, who is the Chairman, president and CEO of Public Service Enterprise Group
 Hughie Lee-Smith (1915–1999), artist
 Cicero Hunt Lewis (1826–1897), merchant
 Robert Lougy, judge on the New Jersey Superior Court who served as acting New Jersey Attorney General in 1996
 Charles McKnight (1750–1791), physician during and after the American Revolutionary War
 Jan Morris (1926–2020), Welsh travel writer and historian, lived in Cranbury for several months in the 1950s whose impressions of the town are recorded in the book Coast to Coast: A Journey Across 1950s America
 Henry Perrine (1797–1840), physician, horticulturist and an enthusiast for introducing tropical plants into cultivation in the United States

In popular culture 
Cranbury is referenced in the 2014 movie Edge of Tomorrow, as the hometown of Major William Cage (played by Tom Cruise). When asked if people of Cranbury plant cranberries, Cage answered: "Tomatoes, best I've ever had."

See also
 List of Washington's Headquarters during the Revolutionary War
 National Register of Historic Places listings in Middlesex County, New Jersey

References

Further reading 
 Chambers, John Whiteclay. Cranbury: A New Jersey Town From the Colonial Era to the Present. (Rivergate Books / Rutgers University Press; 2012)

External links 

 Cranbury Township Official Website
 Cranbury Public Library Website
 Cranbury Township School District
 
 Data for Cranbury Township School, National Center for Education Statistics
 Princeton High School
 Cranbury Historical and Preservation Society
 

 
1872 establishments in New Jersey
Cannabis in New Jersey
Populated places established in 1872
Township form of New Jersey government
Townships in Middlesex County, New Jersey